Wendy Jones (born 25 October 1978) is an Australian netball player. Jacobsen was captain of the Victorian Under 19 team in 1996–97 and the Under 21 team from 1997–99, she represented Victoria from 1990 as an 11-year-old until 2011. She was a scholarship holder at the Australian Institute of Sport in 1997 and 1998. Also a member of the Australian national team from 2005–08. She played in the Commonwealth Bank Trophy with the Melbourne Phoenix from 1998–2007, winning premierships in 2000, 2002–03 and 2005.

With the start of the ANZ Championship in 2008, Jacobsen played with the Melbourne Vixens for the inaugural season. She was signed again for 2009, but a knee injury during the preseason ended her campaign.

Jacobsen re-signed with the Vixens for 2010. In contrast to the 2009 season, 2010 proved disastrous for the Vixens. At the end of the 2010 season, Jacobsen decided to announce her retirement from elite netball after a career gaining 5 premierships and playing 148 matches at the elite level. Outside of netball, Jacobsen also works as a netball coach at Rowville Secondary College in Melbourne.

Wendy has decided to make a return to netball in 2013 to play in the Championship Division of the Victorian Netball League, for Boroondara Genesis with old Vixen team mates Kara Richards and Ashlee Howard.

References

External links
 2010 ANZ Championship profile

Melbourne Vixens players
Melbourne Phoenix players
ANZ Championship players
1978 births
Living people
Australia international netball players
Victorian Netball League players
Netball players from Melbourne
Australian Institute of Sport netball players
People from Croydon, Victoria
Australian netball coaches